Ariaethus of Tegea was a writer of ancient Greece. He wrote a book "On the Early History of Arcadia". The surviving fragments of his work are very few, and offer little insight.

References

Ancient Greek writers